Branky is a municipality and village in Vsetín District in the Zlín Region of the Czech Republic. It has about 1,000 inhabitants.

Notable people
Jiří Křižan (1941–2010), screenwriter, writer and politician

References

Villages in Vsetín District
Moravian Wallachia